Janko Vuković, sometimes spelt Janko Vukovich or von Vukovich, also known as Janko Vuković de Podkapelski or Janko Vuković-Podkapelski (27 September 1871 – 1 November 1918) was a Croatian naval officer who served in the Austro-Hungarian Navy and - amidst its collapse - for a brief period as commander of the fleet of the fledgling State of Slovenes, Croats and Serbs. Vuković saw action in World War I and was appointed commander of the fleet in October 1918 as the Austria-Hungary disintegrated and the entire navy was handed over to the fledgling State of Slovenes, Croats and Serbs.

Biography
He attended the Naval Academy in Fiume (modern Rijeka), and in his naval career he commanded the  pre-Dreadnought , the fast light cruiser , and rose to command of the fleet's flagship, the dreadnought  by the end of the First World War.

Viribus Unitis sinking 

On October 29, 1918 the National Council of Slovenes, Croats and Serbs broke off all relations with Austria and Hungary, establishing the new State of Slovenes, Croats and Serbs. Subsequently, Emperor Charles I gave the entire Austro-Hungarian Navy, merchant fleet, and all its installations to the new state. When representatives of the National Council arrived at the naval base at Pula on October 31, the commander in chief, Admiral Miklós Horthy, asked to whom he should hand over command of the fleet. The representatives had not considered the matter, and after some discussion accepted Horthy's suggestion of Vuković, who was promoted to rear-admiral and made commander in chief of the new country's navy when Horthy's flag was lowered at 5 pm.

Overnight, an Italian sabotage team from a nearby patrol boat, who had not heard of the new State's creation and non-belligerence, penetrated the harbour and laid two 200 kg mines under the  ready to explode at 6:30 sharp. The two-man team was captured and taken aboard Viribus Unitis, where they informed Vuković of what they had done.

Vuković arranged for the prisoners (Raffaele Paolucci and Raffaele Rossetti) to be taken safely to the sister ship , and ordered the evacuation of the ship.  But the explosion did not happen at 6:30 and Vukovic returned to the ship with many sailors. He therefore remained on his ship and went down with her and 300-400 of her crew when the mines exploded shortly afterwards at 6:44. Vuković had been commander-in-chief of his country's fleet for barely twelve hours.

Legacy
Vuković's widow Helena honored him with a plaque on a navy chapel at naval graveyard in Pula in 1919. A memorial plaque commemorating his birthplace was attached to his birthhouse in Jezerane in 1994. His name is also preserved on a plaque honouring all admirals that graduated from the former  in Rijeka, unveiled by Croatian President Ivo Josipović on Navy Day in 2011. Central square in Brinje and a street in Zagreb are  named after Vuković.

Vuković's tragic fate and his sense of honor and duty have inspired an eponymous song by cabaret-rock band from Pula "Gori Ussi Winnetou" as well as two novels: Admiral by Stjepan Vukušić and Admiralski stijeg by Ivan Katušić.

Bibliography
 Vukušić, Stjepan. Admiral. Roman o Janku Vukoviću pl. Podkapelskom, prvom hrvatskom admiralu. Zagreb, Naklada Pavičić, 2004; 
Katušić, Ivan. Admiralski stijeg. Zagreb, Znanje, 1987

References

1871 births
1918 deaths
Croatian Austro-Hungarians
Austro-Hungarian Navy officers
Croatian military personnel in Austrian armies
Croatian admirals
Austro-Hungarian military personnel killed in World War I
People from Lika
19th-century Croatian people
20th-century Croatian people
Captains who went down with the ship
19th-century Croatian military personnel
20th-century Croatian military personnel